Jack Murphy (born July 25, 1979) is an American college basketball coach currently the associate head coach for the Arizona Wildcats of the Pac-12 Conference. Previously, he had been an assistant at University of Memphis.

Prior to serving on the Memphis staff, Murphy was an advance scout and video coordinator for the Denver Nuggets of the National Basketball Association (NBA). Born in Las Vegas, Nevada, Murphy served in several roles at Arizona from 1998 to 2006, beginning as a student manager and eventually moving to recruiting coordinator, video analyst, and director of operations. During this time, he worked with former Memphis head coach Josh Pastner on the staff of Hall of Fame coach Lute Olson. In Murphy's time at Arizona, the Wildcats made eight straight NCAA tournament appearances, reaching the national championship game in 2001. Arizona also posted 20 or more wins in each of Murphy's eight years with the program.

After being promoted to Director of Basketball Operations at Arizona in 2006, Murphy was hired by the Nuggets, where he provided scouting information on upcoming opponents, as well as organizing off-season workout sessions for players. During his time at Arizona and Denver, Murphy developed relationships with many current NBA stars, including Gilbert Arenas, Luke Walton, Allen Iverson, Carmelo Anthony, Marcus Camby, Chauncey Billups and Kenyon Martin.

Murphy was hired by Memphis on June 3, 2009.

On April 12, 2012, Murphy was announced as the new head coach at Northern Arizona. The Lumberjacks were coming off a disastrous 2011–12 season which saw their head coach resign in December and ended with a 16-game losing streak.

Murphy left Northern Arizona on June 2, 2019 to become the top assistant at his alma mater of Arizona, leaving NAU with a 78–149 record in 7 seasons. The Lumberjacks named assistant Burcar as interim head coach for the 2019–20 season.

Head coaching record

References

External links
 Northern Arizona profile

1979 births
Living people
American men's basketball coaches
Basketball coaches from Nevada
Denver Nuggets assistant coaches
Memphis Tigers men's basketball coaches
Northern Arizona Lumberjacks men's basketball coaches
Sportspeople from Las Vegas
University of Arizona alumni